John Jacob Rhodes Jr. (September 18, 1916 – August 24, 2003) was an American lawyer and politician. A member of the Republican Party, Rhodes was elected as a U.S. Representative from Arizona. He was the minority leader in the House of Representatives from 1973–81, where he pressed a conservative agenda.

Early life 
Rhodes was born in Council Grove, Kansas. He met Calvin Coolidge when he was eleven years old, and after shaking hands with the president, reportedly refused to wash his hand for a week. He attended public schools, and in 1938 graduated from Kansas State University in Manhattan, Kansas, where he was a member of Beta Theta Pi fraternity and also earned his U.S. Army Reserve commission via the Reserve Officers Training Corps (ROTC). In 1941, he graduated from Harvard Law School in Cambridge, Massachusetts, and was called to active duty with the United States Army Air Corps, later re-designated the United States Army Air Forces.

Career
He served at Williams Field, Arizona, from 1941 – 1946. After the war, he chose to settle in Arizona with his wife Elizabeth. From 1947 to 1952 he was the staff judge advocate of the Arizona Air National Guard, and from 1951 to 1952 he served as vice chairman of the Arizona Board of Public Welfare.

Political career
In 1950, Rhodes ran for Attorney General of Arizona as a Republican. His friend, Barry Goldwater, correctly predicted that Rhodes would lose; at that time, Arizona was over seventy-five percent Democratic. Despite limited campaign funds and facing the powerful 11-term Democratic incumbent John Murdock, Rhodes prevailed by eight percent of the vote and was elected to the Eighty-third United States Congress. He was the first Republican ever elected to represent Arizona in the House. Additionally, he served as a member of the Arizona delegation to several Republican National Conventions; was Barry Goldwater's personal representative on the Platform Committee in 1964; was chairman of the Platform Committee in 1972; and was Permanent Chairman of the Convention in 1976 and 1980.

Rhodes remained in office for thirty consecutive years (January 3, 1953–January 3, 1983), serving in the 83rd to 97th Congresses. His committee assignments included the following: Education and Labor (1953 – 1959); Interior and Insular Affairs (1953 – 1959); Appropriations, on which he became ranking minority member of the Public Works and Defense Subcommittees (1959 – 1973); Budget (1974 – 1975); Rules (1981 – 1983); and was chairman of the House Republican Policy Committee (1965 – 1973). Rhodes was elected, by acclamation, to be House Minority Leader on December 7, 1973, succeeding Gerald Ford when Ford became Vice President. But House Republicans became unhappy with his strong but low-key leadership and in 1979 he announced he would not seek reelection as leader. Minority Whip Bob Michel replaced him in 1981, though Rhodes remained in the House for that Congress—a fact which he later termed a mistake.

Over the years, Rhodes became very popular in his district, even though many of its residents had never been represented by a Republican before. He fended off a close contest for reelection in 1954, but was not seriously challenged again until 1974, when anger at Watergate held him to only 51 percent of the vote. His district became even safer after a mid-decade redistricting in 1966 cut it back to the fast-growing and strongly conservative East Valley, including his home in Mesa.

Rhodes' biggest two accomplishments in Congress were, first, being the driving force behind congressional authorization of the Central Arizona Project, which provides water from the Colorado River to Arizona; and second, his presence at the August 7, 1974 meeting with President Richard Nixon at which he, Goldwater, and Senator Hugh Scott informed Nixon that he no longer had enough support in Congress to prevent his impeachment and removal from office. (The president announced his resignation the next day.) Rhodes voted in favor of the Civil Rights Acts of 1957 and 1960, as well as the 24th Amendment to the U.S. Constitution and the Voting Rights Act of 1965. Rhodes voted against the initial version of the Civil Rights Act of 1964 but voted in favor of the final version of the bill, while Rhodes voted in favor of the initial version of the Civil Rights Act of 1968 but voted against the final version.

Rhodes himself had maintained his support for the president until the release of the "smoking gun" tape. Saying that "coverup of criminal activity and misuse of federal agencies cannot be condoned or tolerated," he said that he would vote to impeach Nixon when the articles came up for vote in the full House. In short order, all ten Republicans on the House Judiciary Committee announced they would follow suit and vote for impeachment on the full House floor. According to his obituary in The Washington Post, the decision of the House leader of Nixon's own party to break with Nixon and support impeachment was the "coup de grace" for Nixon.

In 1976, Rhodes wrote a book titled The Futile System: How to Unchain Congress and Make the System Work Again, which argued that effective Congressional reforms "cannot be accomplished by the majority party.... The ins have little incentive to change. It is the outs -- the powerless minority -- who have the only real motivation to take a critical look at the system and determine a better way to run things."

Rhodes retired from Congress at age sixty-six. Though still popular in his home district, Rhodes reasoned that "if [he were] ever going to do something else, [he] should get started doing it." His retirement opened the door to a hotly contested Republican primary which was won by John McCain in 1982; McCain went on to victory in November and would be elected to the Senate four years later.

Later life
After leaving Congress, Rhodes maintained an apartment in Bethesda, Maryland, to which he commuted from his home in Mesa. He practiced law in the Washington office of the Richmond, Virginia-based firm of Hunton & Williams. He also traveled extensively, worldwide; was a board member of the Taft Institute for Government and the Hoover Institution for War, Revolution, and Peace and served on the board of and was elected president of the United States Association of Former Members of Congress.

On August 14, 2003, Speaker of the House Dennis Hastert awarded Rhodes one of the first Congressional Distinguished Service Medals, one of only a handful. Rhodes remarked to Hastert that the speaker had the only job Rhodes had ever really wanted.

Personal life
In 1942, Rhodes was married to Elizabeth ("Betty") Harvey.

He died at his home, surrounded by family, on August 24, 2003, from complications related to cancer. He was survived by his wife of sixty-one years, Betty; children John Jacob ("Jay") III, Thomas, Elizabeth, and James Scott ("Scott"); at the time of his death, twelve grandchildren; and several great-grandchildren. Over 100 newspapers carried his obituary, and President George W. Bush delivered a statement via the White House's website.

Rhodes Junior High School in Mesa, Arizona is named in his honor.

Notes 

 Rhodes, John J. I Was There. Salt Lake City, UT: Northwest Publishing, 1995.

References 

"John J. Rhodes Dies; Led GOP In House During Watergate," https://www.washingtonpost.com/wp-dyn/content/article/2003/08/26/AR2005111001244_pf.html
Nelson, Garrison, with Mary T. Mitchell and Clark Bensen. Committees in the U.S. Congress, 1947 – 1992, Volume 2: Committee Histories and Member Assignments. Washington, DC: Congressional Quarterly, Inc., 1994.
Rhodes, John J. I Was There. Salt Lake City, UT: Northwest Publishing, 1995.
Rhodes, John J. The Futile System: How to Unchain Congress and Make the System Work Again. McLean, VA: EPM Publications, Inc., 1976.
Smith, J. Brian. John Rhodes: Man of the House. Phoenix, AZ: Primer Publishers, 2005.

External links

 "Arizona's Statesman: Congressman John J. Rhodes," an online exhibit of items from the John J. Rhodes Collection, housed at the Arizona State University Libraries Archives
 
 

|-

|-

|-

|-

1916 births
2003 deaths
People from Council Grove, Kansas
Republican Party members of the United States House of Representatives from Arizona
Minority leaders of the United States House of Representatives
Conservatism in the United States
Politicians from Mesa, Arizona
20th-century American politicians
Kansas State University alumni
Harvard Law School alumni
United States Army Air Forces officers
Arizona National Guard personnel
Military personnel from Kansas
United States Army Air Forces personnel of World War II
Deaths from cancer in Arizona
Members of Congress who became lobbyists